Carlos Alberto García Charcopa (born September 24, 1978 in Esmeraldas), sometimes known as El Pele, is an Ecuadorian football forward currently playing for River Plate.

External links
FEF Player card

1978 births
Living people
Sportspeople from Esmeraldas, Ecuador
Association football forwards
Ecuadorian footballers
C.S. Emelec footballers
L.D.U. Portoviejo footballers
C.D. ESPOLI footballers
S.D. Quito footballers
C.D. Quevedo footballers
C.S.D. Macará footballers
C.D. Universidad Católica del Ecuador footballers
C.D. El Nacional footballers
Deportivo Azogues footballers
C.D. Técnico Universitario footballers
Barcelona S.C. footballers